"Cardinal" is the second episode of the second season of the American television drama series The Americans, and the 15th overall episode of the series. It originally aired on FX in the United States on March 5, 2014.

Plot

Elizabeth stays mainly close to home to keep watch over the neighborhood and the children. She only ventures out to drop them off at the movies, in order to help Lucia (Aimee Carrero), a former Sandinista-turned agent, with her asset's overdose. Meanwhile, Philip investigates Fred (John Carroll Lynch), the Connors' asset, only to be trapped by him in his house. Philip must convince him that they are all on the same side and in danger. Fred reveals information about a military project soon to be moved. Elsewhere, Nina tells Stan about a Rezidentura "walk-in" wanting to help them. Stan and the FBI learn the man is Bruce Dameran, an employee of the World Bank.

Production
The episode was written by Joel Fields and series creator Joe Weisberg and directed by Daniel Sackheim.

Reception
The A.V. Club Emily VanDerWerff gave the episode a B+ grade.

References

External links
 "Cardinal" at FX
 

The Americans (season 2) episodes
2014 American television episodes
Television episodes directed by Daniel Sackheim